John Bonham (born 25 September 1948) is an Australian former rugby league footballer who played in the 1970s.

Playing career
Originally from Parkes, New South Wales as a Halfback, Bonham was signed by the Newtown club in 1969 and he went on to have four successful seasons with the club. 

He played centre, five-eighth, halfback and hooker for Newtown during his career and was also a prolific goals kicker. He returned to country rugby league in 1975 and represented N.S.W. Country firsts in 1976.

References

1948 births
Living people
Newtown Jets players
Australian rugby league players
Country New South Wales rugby league team players
Rugby league centres
Rugby league five-eighths
Rugby league players from New South Wales